Joseph Henry Wegstein (April 7, 1922 in Washburn, Illinois - August 16, 1985) was an American computer scientist.

Wegstein attended the University of Illinois, where he earned a Bachelor of Science (B.S.) degree in physics in 1944, and graduated with a Master of Science (M.S.) in engineering physics in 1948. He worked as Acting Chief of the Office for Information Processing Standards, at the National Bureau of Standards, now National Institute of Standards and Technology (NIST), where he specialized in technical standards for automatic data processing, especially in the technology of fingerprint recognition.

He participated in conferences in Zurich in 1958 and Paris in 1960 which developed the programming languages ALGOL 58 and ALGOL 60, respectively.

He was involved with international standards in programming and informatics, in at least two groups.

He was a member of the International Federation for Information Processing (IFIP) IFIP Working Group 2.1 on Algorithmic Languages and Calculi, which specified, maintains, and supports the languages ALGOL 60 and 68.

He was a member of the Conference/Committee on Data Systems Languages (CODASYL) committee, and involved in developing the COBOL language.

Publications

References

1922 births
1985 deaths
American computer scientists
University of Illinois alumni
Programming language designers